Odontotermes globicola is a species of small termite of the genus Odontotermes. It is native to India, Malaysia and Sri Lanka. It is found under flower pots and decaying logs. They construct small chambered nest with spherical combed termitaria.

References

External links
Subterranian (sic) termite genus Odontotermes (Blattaria: Isoptera: Termitidae) from Chhattisgarh, India with its annotated checklist and revised key
Termite Assemblages in Lower Hanthana Forest and Variation in Worker Mandible Structure with Food Type
Sampling and identification of termites in Northeastern Puducherry

Termites
Insects described in 1902
Arthropods of Malaysia